The 2002 Vuelta a Burgos was the 24th edition of the Vuelta a Burgos road cycling stage race, which was held from 12 August to 16 August 2002. The race started and finished in Burgos. The race was won by Francisco Mancebo of the  team.

General classification

References

Vuelta a Burgos
2002 in road cycling
2002 in Spanish sport